St. George Jacobite Syrian Church located in Cherai, Ernakulam district of Kerala, is a historical parish of the Jacobite Syrian Christian Church, known locally as Cherai CheriyaPally.

History
St. George Jacobite Syrian Cathedral, Cherai is believed to have been established on 12 October 1871, by a few members who separated from St. Mary's Jacobite Church in Cherai. The first Holy Eucharist (Holy Qurbona) in this church was celebrated by Fr. M C Yakub Kathanar, the son of Avira Chacko, who had bought the land with granted permission of Kingdom of Cochin. On October 12, 1901 a new church was consecrated by Geevarghese Gregorios of Parumala.

Altars 
The major altar is dedicated to Saint George, patron saint of the church; Saint Mary Mother of God, and Saint John the Baptist.

Gallery

References 

Churches in Ernakulam district
Syriac Orthodox churches in India
Religious organizations established in 1871
1871 establishments in India
Churches completed in 1871
19th-century churches in India
19th-century Oriental Orthodox church buildings